Balázs Bényei (born 10 January 1990) is a Hungarian football player who plays for DEAC.

Career

Debrecen
On 29 July 2017, Kinyik played his first match for Debrecen in a 1–1 drawn against Paks in the Hungarian League.

Career statistics

Club

References

External links

1990 births
Living people
Sportspeople from Debrecen
Hungarian footballers
Association football defenders
Létavértes SC players
Mezőkövesdi SE footballers
Békéscsaba 1912 Előre footballers
Debreceni VSC players
Nemzeti Bajnokság I players
Nemzeti Bajnokság II players